José Luis Ramírez (born December 3, 1958) is a Mexican former professional boxer who was a two-time World Lightweight Champion.

Career
A native of Huatabampo, Sonora and a resident of Culiacán, Ramírez made his professional debut on March 25, 1973 at the age of 15. He climbed slowly but steadily on boxing's rankings. In 1978, as a Featherweight, a 19 year old Ramírez lost by knockout for the only time in his career to legendary three time former world champion Rubén Olivares in two rounds.

After his move in weight to the Lightweights, 21-year-old Ramírez accumulated a record of 67-2, and met another boxing legend inside the ring, when he fought Alexis Argüello. Ramírez dropped Argüello for the first time in his career in round six, but lost a disputed ten round split decision in Miami. He then faced Ray Mancini for the North American Lightweight belt, and lost a 12 round decision in Ohio. By then, Ramírez and Julio César Chávez were gymmates and friends.

Ramírez won his following 10 bouts and on May 1, 1983, he was given the chance at becoming world Lightweight champion for the first time, when he fought Puerto Rican Edwin "El Chapo" Rosario at the Coliseo Roberto Clemente in San Juan, Puerto Rico, for the World Boxing Council's championship. Ramírez lost a close 12 round unanimous decision, but on November 3, of 1984, he and Rosario had a rematch, also in San Juan. After rising from two knockdowns, Ramírez rallied back to stagger Rosario in the third round. With Rosario pinned against a corner and Ramírez attacking, referee Steve Crosson stopped the bout in round four, after Ramírez had landed 17 straight punches, making Ramírez a world Lightweight champion for the first time, by a technical knockout. The fight was named the 1984 Ring Magazine fight of the year.

Ramírez then went into training for a defense against Héctor Camacho, another boxer from Puerto Rico. The fight was postponed when Camacho suffered a broken ankle during a pick up basketball game, but it finally came off on August 10, 1985. On his first fight telecast on HBO Boxing, Ramírez was dropped in round three and lost a 12 round unanimous decision.

Ramírez, a culturally intellectual person, moved to Paris soon after. There, he re-grouped, and was able to regain the WBC's world championship when Camacho left it vacant in 1987, by edging out Terrence Alli with another close but unanimous 12 round decision. In his first title defense, he defeated former champion Cornelius Boza-Edwards by fifth round knock out. In his second defense, he was awarded a 12 round split decision victory against future multiple world champion Pernell Whitaker.  The consensus among both United States and English media and fans was that Whitaker deserved to win the fight. European and Latin American media and fans agreed it was the right decision. 

Back in Mexico, he and Chávez were neighbors. Chávez had lifted the World Boxing Association's world Lightweight championship by beating Rosario, and a unification bout between the two friends and neighbors was planned. Ramírez, who is a godfather to one of Chávez's sons, lost an 11 round technical decision to Chávez on October 29 of 1988, which marked the last day he would be a world champion.

In 1989, he tried to win the International Boxing Federation's belt from Whitaker, in Virginia, but he lost a 12 round decision. Then, in 1990, he returned to France, where he lost to Juan Martin Coggi by a decision in 12 for the WBA's world Jr. Welterweight title in Ajaccio. After that bout, he retired.

Ramírez was a member of the less recognized, defunct World Boxing Hall of Fame in California, not to be confused with the more widely recognized International Boxing Hall of Fame in Canastota. In 2003, Ring magazine placed Ramirez on their list of the 100 greatest punchers of all time.

His boxing record is 102–9 (82 KOs). Seven of Ramirez's nine career losses came against future Hall Of Fame members.

Professional boxing record

See also 
 List of lightweight boxing champions
 List of WBC world champions
 List of Mexican boxing world champions

References

External links 
 

1958 births
Lightweight boxers
Living people
Mexican male boxers
Boxers from Sonora
People from Huatabampo
Southpaw boxers
World boxing champions

|-